The 2020–21 season is Dinamo Sassari's 61st in existence and the club's 11th consecutive season in the top tier Italian basketball.

Overview

Kit 
Supplier: EYE Sport Wear / Sponsor: Banco di Sardegna

Lega Basket Serie A

Basketball Champions League

Italian Cup

Supercup

Players

Current roster

Depth chart

Squad changes

In

|}

Out

|}

Confirmed 

|}

Coach

Competitions

Supercup

Final Four

Italian Cup 
Sassari qualified to the 2021 Italian Basketball Cup by ending the first half of the LBA season in the 3rd position. They played the quarterfinal against the 6th ranking Carpegna Prosciutto Basket Pesaro.

Serie A

Regular season

Playoffs

Quarterfinals

Champions League

Regular season

Play-offs

See also 

 2020–21 LBA season
 2020–21 Basketball Champions League
 2021 Italian Basketball Cup
 2020 Italian Basketball Supercup

References 

2020–21 Basketball Champions League
2020–21 in Italian basketball by club